The 2021–22 season is Sreenidi Deccan Football Clubs first season. They participated in the I-League, the first level of Indian football. The Super Cup, the Indian domestic cup, was not held due to the COVID-19 pandemic.

On 5 June 2020, All India Football Federation issued an invitation to accept bids for new clubs to join the I-League from 2020 onwards; on 12 August, Sreenidi Deccan were granted playing rights directly in the 2021–22 season.

Squad

Transfers and loans

Transfers in

Technical staff

{| class="wikitable"
|-
!scope="col"|Role
!scope="col"|Name
|-
|Head coach
| Fernando Santiago Varela
|-
|Assistant coach
| Birendra Thapa
|-
|Conditioning coach
| Jorge Ovando Toledo
|-
|Goalkeeping coach
|TBA
|-
|Performance Analyst
| Saiguhan E.
|-

Pre-season

I-League

Phase 1

Phase 2

Final standings

References

Sreenidi Deccan FC seasons
Sreenidi Deccan